Samuel Šefčík (born 4 November 1996) is a Slovak footballer who plays for Fortuna Liga club Ružomberok as an attacking midfielder or winger.

Club career

ŠK Slovan Bratislava
Šefčík made his Fortuna Liga debut for Slovan Bratislava on 9 April 2016 against Ružomberok. He had to go off, though, after twenty minutes due to injury. He was replaced by future Slovak international, Filip Oršula.

References

External links
 
 FC Vysočina Jihlava profile
 ŠK Slovan Bratislava profile
 
 Futbalnet profile

1996 births
Living people
Footballers from Bratislava
Slovak footballers
Slovak expatriate footballers
Association football midfielders
ŠK Slovan Bratislava players
FK Senica players
FC Vysočina Jihlava players
FC Nitra players
MFK Ružomberok players
2. Liga (Slovakia) players
Slovak Super Liga players
Czech National Football League players
Expatriate footballers in the Czech Republic
Slovak expatriate sportspeople in the Czech Republic